The Mexican Academy League, or the Liga de Mexicana de Beisbol Academia, is a professional minor baseball league sanctioned by the Mexican League.  

The Academy League was founded as a feeder league to the Mexican League. It is composed of eight teams, each of which is affiliated with two Mexican League teams. It has a two seasons per year, the summer season (Liga Clase "A") is ranked Class A, and the winter season (Liga Rookie Invierno) is Rookie-level.

Teams
Laredo-Reynosa
Mexico-Oaxaca
Monclova-Minatitlan
Monterrey-Chihuahua
Quintana Roo-Campeche
Saltillo-Puebla
Veracruz-Tabasco
Yucatán-Laguna

See also
Mexican baseball awards

Academia
Professional sports leagues in Mexico